Kyle Stemberger (born February 15, 2000 - Griffin, Georgia) is an American record producer and currently based in Los Angeles, California. Stemberger has worked with numerous artists and musicians, including Lil Wayne, Jorja Smith, Bad Bunny, Lil Baby, Trippie Redd.

Early life 
Stemberger was born and raised in Griffin, Georgia. At the age of 6, he began practicing playing the piano and later learned to play the guitar. He developed absolute pitch (perfect pitch) in an early age, which is a rare ability of a person to identify or re-create a given musical note without the benefit of a reference tone. Stemberger began to focus on producing when he was in middle school, and he cites Metro Boomin and Zaytoven as influences. After gaining interest in hip hop music, he downloaded a demo version of FL Studio, a digital audio workstation, and began creating beats of his own.

Career 
In 2018, Stemberger began producing for artists and pursuing his passion for music full time. Collaborators include rapper/singers Trippie Redd, Jorja Smith, Flipp Dinero, Southside and KBeaZy. Stemberger has also been working with rising acts such as Kaleb Mitchell, WHATUPRG (Reach Records) and Nafe Smallz. In 2020, Stemberger signed a publishing deal with Prescription Songs, a music publishing company founded by Dr. Luke which resulted in him relocating to Los Angeles. In the same year, Stemberger collaborated with singer Bad Bunny for Las que no iban a salir which peaked at No. 1 on the US Billboard Top Latin Albums.

Notable credits

References

External links 

 

American record producers
Living people
2000 births
Record producers from Georgia (U.S. state)